Alexis Loizidis (born 26 June 1985) is a football defender.

Career
Loizidis began playing football with Atromitos Piraeus, where he played 42 matches and scored 10 goals in the Delta Ethniki. In January 2005, he joined Ionikos F.C. and made one substitute's appearance in the Alpha Ethniki. In August 2005, he was loaned to Keratsini FC where he played 10 matches in Gamma Ethniki and in August 2006 he was loaned to Thiva F.C. where he played 11 matches in Gamma Ethniki.

External links
Profile at EPAE.org
Profile at Guardian Football

1985 births
Living people
Greek footballers
Ionikos F.C. players
Association football defenders
Association football midfielders